Nepotian was briefly the king of Asturias in 842. Prior to that he served as count of the palace under his predecessor, Alfonso II, to whom he was related. Both the nature of this relationship and the legitimacy of his rule are disputed by scholars.

Later sources make him Alfonso's brother-in-law, but this is chronologically implausible, nor is there evidence for such a sister. The earliest chronicle simply calls him Alfonso's kinsman. Likewise he is sometimes identified with a man of this name who appears in a charter of King Silo, but were he the same he would have been in his nineties at the time he machinated for the throne.

He did not hold the crown long.  The same year another kinsman of Alfonso, Ramiro, defeated Nepocian at the Battle of the Bridge of Cornellana, by the river Narcea, and thus became king as Ramiro I.

Notes

Sources

8th-century Asturian monarchs